Ormskirk and District General Hospital is an acute hospital at Ormskirk, Lancashire. It is managed by the Southport and Ormskirk Hospital NHS Trust.

History
The hospital has its origins in the Ormskirk Union Workhouse Infirmary which was established in 1853. It became the County Hospital and Institution in the 1930s and, after joining the National Health Service in 1948, it went on to become Ormskirk County Hospital in the 1950s and subsequently Ormskirk and District General Hospital.

References

NHS hospitals in England
Hospitals in Lancashire